Vändåtberget is a nature reserve in Västernorrland County in Sweden located 50 kilometres northwest of the town Örnsköldsvik. The reserve was established on 1 July 1989 and has an area of 3.45 km2.

The old-growth forest of Vändåt is a habitat for the highly endangered beetle Pytho kolwensis, in the genus Pytho and the family Pythidae. It is also a habitat for a longhorn beetle, Nothorhina punctata.

The meaning of the name “Vändåt” is not known.

References

External links 

Nature reserves in Sweden
Protected areas established in 1989
Geography of Västernorrland County
1989 establishments in Sweden